is a Japanese footballer who plays as a winger or right back for  club Nagoya Grampus.

Career
Ishida was born in Kanagawa Prefecture on December 13, 2001. He joined J1 League club Nagoya Grampus from youth team in 2018. On August 22, he debuted against Sanfrecce Hiroshima in Emperor's Cup.

Club statistics
.

References

External links

2001 births
Living people
Association football people from Kanagawa Prefecture
Japanese footballers
J1 League players
Nagoya Grampus players
Association football forwards